Pazhavilai  is a small village (2sq km area) located at 8 km from Nagercoil, Tamil Nadu, India.
It is located near the Nagercoil-Colachel Road. Bus with route number 38E/G, 40,38K, 54 are the buses running through pazhavilai.
It is famous for Kamarajar Polytechnic College and Rajakkamangalam Punchyat Union Office (Block Development Office famously referred as Block Office) for Neendakarai B Agastheeswaram Taluk. Pazhavilai Post Office (629501) is the postal office responsible for distribution of post to many small villages surrounds Pazhavilai.

Environment
The Green environment with rich coconut plants, Cashew nut trees and Banana plantations prevailing in the village is marvelous.

Spirituality
Mutharamman Temple (முத்தாரம்மன் கோவில்), Pattrakali Amman koil (பத்ரகாளி அம்மன் கோவில்), Guruswamy koil (குருசுவாமி கோவில்), Sastha temple are the famous temples located near the Block Development Office. Mutharamman temple annual celebrations takes place in the Tamil month Chitirai (சித்திரை) (English Month: May), famously referred as "Kovil Kodai Vizha" (கோவில் கொடை விழா). All the family members working in remote cities also come back to the village to take part in the celebration.

Education
Pazhavilai Middle school

Pazhavilai Middle school is located adjacent to Block Office. The School fulfills the primary education of the people of nearest villages. Even though most of the people prefer the schools in the Nagercoil town, still the Pazhavilai School satisfies some poor children around the village.

NMS Kamaraj Polytechnic College Kamaraj Polytechnic College serves as the important technical education institution in the district. It is Tamil Nadu Government Aided Institution run by a society called "Nadar Mahajana Sangam". This College has provided good technical education, employment after completing the studies to many village students. The institution is sprawling across a large area, has a basketball ground, cricket ground, a Sastha temple (சாஸ்தா கோவில்), students hostel and surrounded by rich coconut trees and plantations 

NMS Kamaraj College of Education

Inside the campus of the Kamaraj Polytechnic, a B.Ed college is also run by "Nadar Mahajana Sangam".

Sakker Nursery and Primary SchoolThen Sakker Nursery and Primary School is Located near Kamaraj Polytechnic College.

Villages in Kanyakumari district